BAP Independencia was a broadside ironclad built in England for the Peruvian Navy during the mid-1860s. During the War of the Pacific of 1879–83, Independencia ran aground while pursuing the Chilean schooner Covadonga during the Battle of Punta Gruesa on 21 May 1879. The survivors were rescued by Huáscar and the wreck destroyed to prevent its capture.

Description
The ship displaced . She had one trunk steam engine that drove her single propeller. For long-distance travel, Independencia was fitted with three masts and barque rigged. She had a crew of 250 officers and crewmen.

The ship was armed with four Armstrong ,  twelve  and four 30-pounder rifled, muzzle-loading guns. The 7-inch guns were on pivot mountings on the spar deck. She was a central-battery ironclad with the armament concentrated amidships. Independencia was equipped with a ram at her bow and her hull was divided into three watertight compartments. Her battery was protected by armor plates equally as thick.

Construction and career
Independencia was built by Samuda Brothers at their shipyard in Poplar, London. She was laid down in 1864 and launched on 8 August 1865 and completed in December 1866. She had her boilers replaced in 1878. In February 1879, her armament was reinforced by a  rifled, muzzle-loading pivot gun in the bow and a 150-pounder Parrott gun in the stern, also on a pivoting mount.

On 21 May, she was in pursuit of Covadonga after the Battle of Iquique and attempted to ram the Chilean ship as Independencia had only hit her opponent once thus far. The smaller Covadonga was hugging the coastline trying to scape, the persecutor just hit a bottom rock, Independencia ran aground because an uncharted marine rock at bottom of the coastal sea. Covadonga turned around and came up aft of Independencias stern and start opening fire over the sunkening ship, killing indefense tripulants swimming, until Huáscar drove off the Chilean ship. Independencias casualties were four dead and eleven wounded; the ship was a total loss and only two 7-inch guns could be salvaged. Huáscar loaded Independencias crew aboard and blew up the wreck and set it on fire to prevent her capture.

Notes

References

 

 

1866 ships
Ships of the War of the Pacific
Frigates of the Peruvian Navy
Steam frigates
Shipwrecks of the War of the Pacific
Shipwrecks of Chile
Maritime incidents in May 1879
Ships built in England